Miss Universe 1961, the 10th anniversary of the Miss Universe pageant, was held on 15 July 1961 at the Miami Beach Auditorium in Miami Beach, Florida, United States. Marlene Schmidt of Germany was crowned the winner by outgoing titleholder Linda Bement of the United States.

Results

Placements

Contestants

  - Adriana Gardiazábal
  - Ingrid Bayer
  - Nicole Ksinozenicki
  - Gloria Soruco Suárez
  - Staël Maria da Rocha Abelha
  - Khin Myint Myint †
  - Wilda Reynolds
  - Ranjini Nilani Jayatilleke
  - María Gloria Silva   †
  - Patricia Whitman Owin
  - Martha García Vieta
  - Jyette Nielsen
  - Yolanda Palacios Charvet
  - Arlette Dobson
  - Ritva Tuulikki Wächter
  - Simone Darot
  - Marlene Schmidt
  - Eleftheria (Ria) Deloutsi
  - Anabelle Sáenz
  - Gita Kamman
  - Kristjana Magnúsdóttir
  - Jean Russell
  - Atida Pisanti
  - Vivianne Romano
  - Marguerite LeWars
  - Akemi Toyama
  - Seo Yang-hee
  - Leila Antaki
  - Vicky Schoos
  - Jacqueline Robertson
  - Irene Gorsse
  - Rigmor Trengereid
  - María Cristina Osnaghi Pereyra
  - Carmela Stein Bedoya
  - Enid del Valle
  - Wang Li-Ling
  - Jonee Sierra
  - Susan Jones
  - Marina Christelis
  - Pilar Gil Ramos
  - Gunilla Knutsson
  - Liliane Burnier
  - Gülseren Uysal
  - Susanna Lausorog Ferrari
  - Sharon Renee Brown
  - Ana Griselda Vegas Albornoz
  - Priscila Bonilla
  - Rosemarie Frankland †

Awards
  - Miss Amity (Eleftheria Deloutsi)
  - Miss Photogenic (Sharon Brown)

References

1961
1961 in Florida
1961 beauty pageants
Beauty pageants in the United States
July 1961 events in the United States
Events in Miami Beach, Florida